Haría is a municipality on the island of Lanzarote in the Canary Islands, the northernmost and easternmost Canarian municipality. Surrounded on three sides by the Atlantic Ocean, the municipality is bordered to the south by the municipality of Teguise. It forms part of Las Palmas Province. The seat of the municipality is the town of Haría. The population of the municipality was 4,872 in 2013.

Geography 
The west of the municipality is largely mountainous, with much of the western coastline rising steeply a little way inland. Numerous miradors (viewpoints) on this high ground offer views of the island, with the most well known being the Mirador del Río which is a popular tourist attraction. To the southeast the land is low-lying and largely used for agriculture, with many small beach resorts along the coast. The northeast of the municipality is largely uninhabited, having been buried approximately 3000 years ago by the eruption of the Montaña Corona which formed the inhospitable Malpais de la Corona. This eruption also produced extensive hollow lava tunnels called jameos, some of which have been developed into two of the island's most-visited geological attractions: the Cueva de los Verdes and the Jameos del Agua.

Communities 
 Arrieta
 Casa La Breña
 Casas Las Escarnas
 Charco del Palo
 Guinate
 Haría
 Los Molinos
 Mágues
 Mala
 Órzola
 Punta Mujeres
 Tabayesco
 Ye

Sites of interest 
 Mirador del Río
 Jameos del Agua
 Cave of los Verdes
 Montaña Corona

See also 
List of municipalities in Las Palmas

References 

Municipalities in Lanzarote